Iota Hydrae (ι Hydrae, abbreviated Iota Hya, ι Hya), formally named Ukdah , is a star in the constellation of Hydra, about 8° to the north-northwest of Alphard (Alpha Hydrae) and just to the south of the celestial equator. Visible to the naked eye, it is a suspected variable star with an apparent visual magnitude that ranges between 3.87 and 3.91. Based upon an annual parallax shift of 12.39 mas measured during the Hipparcos mission, it is located around 263 light-years from the Sun.

Nomenclature 

ι Hydrae (Latinised to Iota Hydrae) is the star's Bayer designation.

This star along with Tau¹ Hydrae, Tau² Hydrae and 33 Hydrae (A Hydrae), were Ptolemy's Καμπή (Kampē); but Kazwini knew them as عقدة ʽuqdah (or ʽuḳdah) "knot". According to a 1971 NASA memorandum, Ukdah was the name of an asterism of four stars: Tau¹ Hydrae as Uḳdah I, Tau² Hydrae as Uḳdah II, 33 Hydrae as Uḳdah III and Iota Hydrae as Uḳdah IV. In 2016, the IAU organized a Working Group on Star Names (WGSN) to catalog and standardize proper names for stars. The WGSN approved the name Ukdah for Iota Hydrae on 1 June 2018 and it is now so included in the List of IAU-approved Star Names.

Properties 

This is an evolved K-type giant star with a stellar classification of K2.5 III. It is a Barium star, which means that, for a giant star, it displays unusually strong absorption lines of singly-ionized barium and strontium. Iota Hydrae has nearly twice the mass of the Sun and has expanded to 33 times the Sun's radius. It is around 2.5 billion years old and is spinning with a leisurely projected rotational velocity of 4.5 km/s. It may be a member of the Wolf 630 moving group of stars that share a common trajectory through space.

References

K-type giants
Suspected variables
Barium stars
Hydra (constellation)
Hydrae, Iota
Durchmusterung objects
Hydrae, 35
083618
047431
3845
Uḳdah IV